Karanimandapam is a place in Uthiramerur taluk, Kanchipuram district. This place is quite busy always, as it is considered to be the main hub for the surrounding places situated around Karanimandapam. The postal code of Karanimandapam is 603403. There is orphanage named Thiruvalluvar Gurukulam, which serves many homeless children.
Temples in Karanimandapam:
Lord Ganesha temple and the Goddess Kaniyamman temple are situated here.
Schools in Karanimandapam: Serv Sev Vidyalaya and Mercury Primary School.

Kanchipuram district